The Cinémathèque nationale du Liban is a film archive in Beirut, Lebanon.

See also 
 List of film archives

References

External links 
 https://web.archive.org/web/20120405172846/http://www.culture.gov.lb/ministere/?sect=5&subsect=1&subsubsect=2&subsubsubsect=1
The website, in French, is 

Film archives in Asia
Archives in Lebanon